Stizolobic acid is an amino acid found in the sap epicotyl tips of etiolated seedlings of Stizolobium hassjoo.

Biosynthesis
Stizolobium hassjoo catalyzes the conversion of L-dihydroxyphenylalanine into stizolobinic acid, alpha-amino-6-carboxy-2-oxo-2H-pyran-3-propionic acid, and stizolobic acid, alpha-amino-6-carboxy-2-oxo-2H-pyran-4-propionic acid, in the presence of NADP+ or NAD+ under aerobic conditions.

References

Amino acids
Dicarboxylic acids
Lactones